The 2014 Winter Olympics torch relay was run from October 7, 2013, 123 days prior to the Sochi 2014 Winter Olympics, until February 7, 2014, the day of the opening ceremony at Sochi. In Russia the relay traveled from Moscow to Sochi through 2,900 towns and villages across all 83 federal subjects of Russia by foot, car, train, plane, and troika for over 65,000 km of journey. The event became the longest relay in Winter Olympics history.

The lighting ceremony was held on September 29, 2013 at Olympia, Greece with Greek alpine skier Ioannis Antoniou as the relay originating torchbearer. The first Russian torchbearer was NHL star Alex Ovechkin, who received the torch from Antoniou in Olympia.

The Torches
The 2014 Olympic Torches were unveiled on January 14, 2013 in Moscow. The torch is chrome with red detail, a traditional colour of Russian sport.

The torches failed on at least forty-four occasions during the relay, a failure rate of about 3 percent compared to the average 5 percent at the previous Olympics, and on one occasion, a nearby guard helped light the fire again with a lighter. The People's Front (a movement created and led by Vladimir Putin) has called for a criminal investigation into the manufacturer of the torches, a rocket/missile factory.

Special relay

On October 20, 2013, the torches reached the North Pole for first time via a nuclear-powered icebreaker 50 Let Pobedy. On November 6, 2013, the torch was flown into space by Soyuz rocket and brought back on November 11. The torch reached Europe's highest mountain, Mount Elbrus, and the depths of Siberia's Lake Baikal.

Route in Greece
September 29 (day 1)
Olympia, Amaliada, Elis, Pyrgos, Zacharo, Kalo Nero, Tripoli, Levidi, Lefkasi, Kalavryta
September 30 (day 2)
Patras, Rio, Missolonghi, Agrinio, Karpenisi
October 1 (day 3)
Lamia, Volos, Larissa, Katerini
October 2 (day 4)
Thessaloniki, Giannitsa, Naousa, Edessa, Florina, Kastoria
October 3 (day 5)
Grevena, Ioannina, Kalabaka, Trikala
October 4 (day 6)
Karditsa, Lamia, Amfissa, Delphi, Arachova, Livadeia, Athens

Route in Russia

Protests
Gay activist Pavel Lebedev (not to be confused with a Russian retired figure skater Pavel Lebedev) was arrested at the relay in Voronezh for unveiling a rainbow flag. When interviewed he said "hosting the games here contradicts the basic principles of the Olympics, which is to cultivate tolerance".

References

External links
Official website
Coca-Cola torch relay

torch relay
Olympic torch relays
Articles containing video clips